Desna is an urban-type settlement in Chernihiv Raion, Chernihiv Oblast in northern Ukraine. It hosts the administration of Desna settlement hromada, one of the hromadas of Ukraine. The settlement's population was 7,180 as of the 2001 Ukrainian Census. Current population:  It is named after the Desna River which flows through the settlement.

Until 18 July 2020, Desna belonged to Kozelets Raion. The raion was abolished in July 2020 as part of the administrative reform of Ukraine, which reduced the number of raions of Chernihiv Oblast to five. The area of Kozelets Raion was merged into Chernihiv Raion.

The town houses a major military training center (169th Training Centre) of the Ukrainian Ground Forces. It suffered an airstrike by Russian forces on 17 May 2022 during the 2022 Russian invasion of Ukraine, which caused significant loss of life of Ukrainian Military personnel stationed at the base. On the 25 of June the town was again attacked by the Russians with Cruise missiles, causing large amounts of damage but no casualties were reported.

References

External links
 

Populated places established in 1960
Populated places on the Desna in Ukraine
Urban-type settlements in Chernihiv Raion